Jean Charles is a 2009 British-Brazilian feature film depicting the life of Jean Charles de Menezes, the Brazilian immigrant wrongly shot dead by the Metropolitan Police at Stockwell tube station in London on 22 July 2005, after being mistaken for a terrorist.

The film was directed by Henrique Goldman and received its international premiere at the 2009 Toronto International Film Festival. Selton Mello stars as Jean Charles with many of the other roles played by the actual friends and family of Jean Charles de Menezes. Award winning director Stephen Frears was an executive producer for the film.

Cast
 Selton Mello as Jean Charles
 Vanessa Giácomo as Vivian
 Marek Oravec as Iatzek
 Luís Miranda as Alex
 Patricia Armani as Patricia
 Maurício Varlotta as Maurício
 Sidney Magal as himself
 Daniel de Oliveira as Marcelo
 Marcelo Soares as Chuliquinha
 Rogério Dionísio as Bisley
 Julian Harries as English Man
 Denise Stephenson as Female Police Liaison Officer
 Christopher Pencakowski as Male Police Liaison Officer

References

External links
 

2009 films
2000s Portuguese-language films
2000s English-language films
Brazilian biographical drama films
2009 biographical drama films
Films shot in London
Films shot in Paulínia
British biographical drama films
Brazilian multilingual films
British multilingual films
2000s British films